The Minnesota Duluth Bulldogs women's ice hockey team plays for the University of Minnesota Duluth at the AMSOIL Arena in Duluth, Minnesota. The team is a member of the Western Collegiate Hockey Association (WCHA) and competes in the National Collegiate Athletic Association (NCAA) in the Division I tier. The Bulldogs have won five NCAA Championships.

History
On September 10, 1997, University of Minnesota Duluth Chancellor Kathryn A. Martin and Athletic Director Bob Corran announced that women's Division I hockey would be making its debut at UMD for the 1999–2000 season.  On April 20, 1998, Shannon Miller, head coach of Team Canada at the 1998 Winter Olympics, was hired as the head coach.

On October 1, 1999, the Bulldogs played their first exhibition game in Salt Lake City, Utah, against the Olympic Oval Team from Calgary, Alberta.  This game opened the new hockey facility for the 2002 Olympic Games.

The Bulldogs played the Wisconsin Badgers on October 8, 1999 in the first women's WCHA conference game at the Kohl Center in Madison, WI. It was the highest attended game of the season (3,892) and resulted in an 8–0 defeat of the Badgers. Forward Maria Rooth (Ängelholm, Sweden) was selected as Player of the Week in the WCHA on November 22, 1999, the first for UMD.

The Bulldogs season-starting winning streak of 12 games was snapped by Princeton University with a 2–2 tie in Princeton, NJ on December 10, 1999. UMD won the Lake Placid Tournament hosted by St. Lawrence University on January 22, 2000. Freshman goalie Tuula Puputti, freshman forward Hanne Sikio and junior defenseman Brittny Ralph were named to the All-Tournament Team. Sikio was also selected as the Tournament Most Valuable Player. 
The Minnesota Gophers hand the Bulldogs their first conference loss 4–3 in a sold out game at Pioneer Hall (Duluth, MN) on February 11, 2000.

The Bulldogs clinched the women's WCHA regular season championship on February 26, 2000 with a sweep of Minnesota State-Mankato and earned the number one seed for the 2000 WCHA playoffs.

UMD took the inaugural NCAA Division I national championship on March 25, 2001 by defeating St. Lawrence University by a score of 4–2. This marked the first NCAA team championship for the Bulldogs. Maria Rooth was named Most Valuable Player of the tournament while her teammates Tuula Puputti and Brittny Ralph were named to the All-Tournament team. On June 25, 2001 the Bulldogs were honored at the White House by President George W. Bush, the first women's hockey team to be invited to the White House.

Five Bulldogs traveled to Salt Lake City to compete with their national teams at the 2002 Winter Olympics. From the 2001–2002 roster, forwards Maria Rooth and Erika Holst played for bronze medal winner Sweden while forward Hanne Sikio and goaltender Tuula Puputti skated for fourth-place Finland.  Kristina Petrovskaia finished fifth with Team Russia. UMD also had two players in the Olympic final game, 2001–2002 newcomer and Olympic gold medalist Caroline Ouellette (Canada) and returning Bulldog and 2002 Olympic silver medalist Jenny Potter (USA).

The Bulldogs, 2002 NCAA national women’s hockey champions, were recognized by the Minnesota Twins baseball team at the H.H.H. Metrodome in Minneapolis on May 6, 2002. Jenny Potter set an NCAA record (since tied) for most goals in one game with 6. This was accomplished on December 18, 2002 versus St. Cloud State. Ouellette set an NCAA record for most shorthanded goals in one game with 2. This was accomplished on November 14, 2003 versus North Dakota.

On March 22, 2010 Duluth Mayor Don Ness presented Shannon Miller with a proclamation declaring Friday, March 26, 2010 as "Shannon Miller Day."

On January 21, 2011, The top-ranked Badgers defeated the Bulldogs on the opening night of AMSOIL arena in front of 1,639 fans. The Badgers defeated the Bulldogs 4–1, extending their 11 game-winning streak, best in the NCAA. The Bulldogs still lead the all-time series 26–21–9. A ceremonial puck drop featured Bulldog legends Jenny Potter, Caroline Ouellette and Maria Rooth. In both games, the Bulldogs wore special edition black jerseys. The following day (January 22), for only the second time this season, the Bulldogs found themselves in a two-goal deficit after the first period of play. Despite trailing the No. 1 University of Wisconsin by two goals in each of the three periods, the Bulldogs scored three goals in the final 11 minutes of regulation to earn a 4–4 draw with the top-ranked Badgers in AMSOIL Arena.

Rivalries
Minnesota–Duluth, a traditional rival to the Minnesota Golden Gophers in men's hockey, would start its own rivalry in the women’s game. The school gave a three-year, $210,000 contract to Shannon Miller, who coached Canada to the 1998 Olympic final in Nagano. Miller recruited players from Canada, Finland and Sweden, including four Olympians. The rivalry grew as Miller recruited a pair of players away from Minnesota: star forward Jenny Schmidgall, (whose 93 points in 1999–2000 would lead the nation), and defenseman Brittny Ralph, who would serve as the Bulldogs' first ever captain. In the first season, Duluth would lose just once to the Gophers in their first five meetings, which included a 2–0 Bulldogs victory in the final of the WCHA tournament.

Attendance
When the program still played at the DECC, despite the team's success, UMD women's hockey rarely drew a large crowd to its home ice. According to the website US College Hockey Online, the women's hockey team averaged 610 people out of an official 5233 seats, an 11.6% capacity. Even while winning five national titles, more than any other program, the Bulldogs averaged sixth in attendance in women's Division I hockey. The men's team, however, averaged an attendance of 4253 per game having won one national title, an 86.2% capacity rating. They moved in with the men's team in 2010 to the new AMSOIL Arena.

Season by season results
Note: GP = Games played, W = Wins, L = Losses, T = Ties

Olympians
The UMD Bulldogs program has had more Winter Olympians than any other program in the history of NCAA Division I Women's Ice Hockey; 33 current or former Bulldogs have competed in the Olympic Women's ice hockey tournament.

Jenny Schmidgall-Potter, 1998, 2002, 2006 and 2010 (A),  United States
Caroline Ouellette, 2002, 2006 and 2010 (A),  Canada
Tuula Puputti, 2002,  Finland
Hanne Sikiö, 2002,  Finland
Kristina Petrovskaia, 2002, 2006 and 2010,  Russia
Erika Holst, 2002, 2006 and 2010,  Sweden
Maria Rooth, 2002, 2006 and 2010,  Sweden
Satu Kiipeli, 2006,  Finland
Nora Tallus, 2006,  Finland
Jennifer Harß, 2006,  Germany
Iya Gavrilova, 2006, 2010 and 2014,  Russia
Haley Irwin, 2010, 2014 and 2018,  Canada
Heidi Pelttari, 2010,  Finland
Mariia Posa, 2010,  Finland
Saara Tuominen, 2010,  Finland
Jenni Asserholt, 2006 & 2010,  Sweden
Elin Holmlöv, 2010,  Sweden
Pernilla Winberg, 2010 and 2018,  Sweden
Kim Martin, 2010,  Sweden
Jocelyne Larocque, 2014 and 2018,  Canada
Eveliina Suonpää, 2014 and 2018,  Finland
Tea Villilä, 2014,  Finland
Maria Lindh, 2014 and 2018,  Sweden
Lara Stalder, 2014 and 2018,  Switzerland
Brigette Lacquette, 2018,  Canada
Sidney Morin, 2018,  United States
Maddie Rooney, 2018,  United States

There are only two Bulldogs players who have won gold in the midst of their college eligibility: Haley Irwin with Team Canada in 2014 and Maddie Rooney with Team USA in 2018.

Postseason history
 Won the first three NCAA Division I women's ice hockey national championships in 2001, 2002, and 2003.
On March 18, 2007 the Bulldogs lost in the NCAA Frozen Four championship game to Wisconsin 4–1.
The Bulldogs won their fourth national title in 2008 by defeating two-time defending champion Wisconsin 4–0 in Duluth. The victory capped a memorable season for UMD, which went 33–4–1 and also scored an overtime victory over Wisconsin to win the title of the WCHA Final Face-off, the league playoff championship.
 Won their fifth NCAA Division I women's ice hockey national championship in 2010.

Current roster
As of August 21, 2022.

Notable alumni

Iya Gavrilova
Jennifer Harß
Kim Martin Hasson
Haley Irwin
Jocelyne Larocque
Caroline Ouellette
Mariia Posa
Maria Rooth
Jenny Schmidgall-Potter
Eveliina Suonpää
Nora Tallus
Maddie Rooney
Pernilla Winberg

Awards and honors
Ashton Bell, 2020-21 WCHA Defenseman of the Year
Maria Rooth, Player of the Week in the WCHA on November 22, 1999
Emma Soderberg, 2020-21 WCHA Goaltender of the Year

All-Americans
Emma Soderberg, 2020-21 Second Team CCM/AHCA All-American
Ashton Bell, 2020-21 Second Team CCM/AHCA All-American, 2022-23 First Team CCM/AHCA All-American
Lara Stalder, 2017, First Team All-American
Sidney Morin, 2017, Second Team All-American
Jocelyne Larocque, 2011 and 2009 First Team All-America selection
Emmanuelle Blais, 2010, First Team All-American
Kim Martin, 2008, First Team All-American
Ritta Schaublin, 2006, First Team All-American
Caroline Ouellette, 2005 and 2004, First Team All-American
Julianne Vasichek, 2005 and 2004, Second Team All-American
Jenny Potter, 2004, 2003 and 200, First Team All-American
Maria Rooth, 2002 and 2001, First Team All-American; 2003, Second Team All-American

Division I Player of the Month
Lara Stalder, Women's Hockey Commissioners' Association National Division I Player of the Month, January 2017

Frozen Four honors
Jessica Koizumi, 2007 NCAA Frozen Four All-Tournament Team
Emmanuelle Blais, 2010 NCAA Frozen Four All-Tournament Team
Jessica Wong, 2010 NCAA Frozen Four All-Tournament Team
Laura Fridfinnson, 2010 NCAA Frozen Four All-Tournament Team

Patty Kazmaier Award nominees
Noemie Marin, Top 10 Finalist, 2006 Patty Kazmaier Award
Noemie Marin, Top 10 Finalist for 2007 Patty Kazmaier Award 
Riitta Schaublin, Top 3 Finalist, 2006 Patty Kazmaier Award
Emmanuelle Blais, 2010 Patty Kazmaier Award nominee
Laura Fridfinnson, 2010 Patty Kazmaier Award nominee

Statistical leaders
 Caroline Ouellette, NCAA leader, 2003–04 season, Points per game, 2.38
 Caroline Ouellette, NCAA leader, 2003–04 season, Assists per game, 1.47
 Patricia Sautter, NCAA leader, 2001–02 season, Goalie winning percentage, .868

WCHA All-Star teams
Brigette Lacquette, 2015 All-WCHA Second Team
Zoe Hickel, 2015 All-WCHA Second Team
Ashton Bell, 2020–21 WCHA First Team All-Star 
Emma Soderberg, 2020–21 WCHA First Team All-Star
Gabbie Hughes, 2020–21 All-WCHA Second Team
Anna Klein, 2020–21 All-WCHA Second Team

Bulldogs in elite ice hockey

Retired numbers
Maria Rooth is one of two University of Minnesota Duluth female athletes in any sport to have her jersey number retired.

See also
 Minnesota–Duluth Bulldogs men's ice hockey
 List of college women's ice hockey coaches with 250 wins (Shannon Miller ranks sixth on all-time list)

References

External links

 
Ice hockey teams in Minnesota
1997 establishments in Minnesota
Ice hockey clubs established in 1997